Gurbangeldi Durdyýew is a Turkmen former football player who currently a head coach of Turkmenistan national under-23 football team.

Durdiyev played for the Turkmenistan national football team from 1992 to 2004, scoring four goals.

International career statistics

Goals for Senior National Team

Personal life
Gurbangeldi Durdyýew's son Didar is also a Turkmenistani footballer, who plays for the national team.

References

Turkmenistan footballers
Turkmenistan expatriate footballers
Turkmenistan international footballers
2004 AFC Asian Cup players
FC Metalist Kharkiv players
FC Aşgabat players
FC Zhenis Astana players
FC Nisa Aşgabat players
FC Shakhter Karagandy players
FC Akzhayik players
FK Köpetdag Aşgabat players
F.C. Aboomoslem players
Expatriate footballers in Ukraine
Turkmenistan expatriate sportspeople in Ukraine
1973 births
Living people
Turkmenistan expatriate sportspeople in Kazakhstan
Expatriate footballers in Kazakhstan
Turkmenistan expatriate sportspeople in Iran
Expatriate footballers in Iran
Association football midfielders
Footballers at the 1994 Asian Games
Footballers at the 1998 Asian Games
Asian Games competitors for Turkmenistan